Otrada is a rural locality (a settlement) in Panino, Paninsky District, Voronezh Oblast, Russia. The population was 116 as of 2010.

Geography 
Otrada is located 5 km northeast of Panino (the district's administrative centre) by road. Panino is the nearest rural locality.

References 

Rural localities in Paninsky District